The Mountain Will Fall is the fifth studio album by American music producer DJ Shadow. It was released on June 24, 2016 by Mass Appeal Records.

Critical reception

The Mountain Will Fall received generally positive reviews from critics. At Metacritic, which assigns a normalized rating out of 100 to reviews from mainstream publications, the album received an average score of 66, based on 26 reviews. Adam Workman from The National said DJ Shadow gave his "sample-heavy, largely instrumental hip-hop" music a more "ambitious scope" than on his previous records, while Spin journalist Brian Josephs believed his "brisk electronic direction" contributed to a coherence that was missing on The Outsider (2006) and The Less You Know, the Better (2011). Exclaim!s Daryl Keating said "he still has the chops to cut a good record when he's not doing a complete gear change and then turning down the wrong road at full speed." Robert Christgau gave The Mountain Will Fall a three-star honorable mention in his column for Vice, deeming it DJ Shadow's best album since The Private Press (2002) but "a sound effects record by comparison, heavy on first-rate texture, rumble, and of course beats"; he named "Nobody Speak", "Mambo", and the title track as highlights.

Track listing

Charts

Weekly charts

Year-end charts

References

External links
 

DJ Shadow albums
2016 albums
Instrumental hip hop albums
Mass Appeal Records albums